Mihailo Apostolski (born Mihail Mitev Apostolov, ;   or Mihailo Mitić; November 8, 1906 – August 7, 1987) was a Macedonian  general, partisan,  military theoretician, politician, academic and historian. He was the commander of the General Staff of the National Liberation Army and Partisan Detachments of Macedonia, colonel general of the Yugoslav National Army, and was declared a People's Hero of Yugoslavia.

Biography

Early life
Apostolski was born in Novo Selo, then in the Kosovo vilayet of the Ottoman Empire. He attended primary and secondary school in Štip. In 1927 graduated from the Military Academy in Belgrade, capital of Kingdom of Yugoslavia. In 1933 he graduated from the High Military Academy, and in 1938 he graduated from the Commanding Academy as a major.

During World War II
During the invasion of Yugoslavia in April 1941, he was a commander of the alpine units of the Royal Yugoslav Army in Ljubljana. According to another report, he was a general staff officer in charge of the railway transport. At that time he was in Belgrade. After the capitulation of Yugoslavia and the subsequent occupation of Vardar Macedonia, Apostolski returned to Ljubljana, where was captured by the Italian army and was taken to the camp Vestone. Shortly after, his father, a First World War Bulgarian army veteran, petitioned the Bulgarian Minister of War to help release Apostolski.

After being released from prison, Apostolski received a certificate that he was a trustworthy Bulgarian. Later he filed an application for appointment in the Bulgarian army. He was offered the rank of captain, however he refused. Later, General Lukash, interceded for him, looking for a job in the BDZ system, but without success. Afterwards, Apostolski entered the Sofia University, where he conducted underground work. In April 1942 he became a member of the Communist Party of Yugoslavia, and in June the same year he was appointed commander of the General Staff of the National Liberation Army and Partisan Detachments of Macedonia. In May 1943 he was promoted to Major General. During the Second Session of AVNOJ he became a member of the Presidency of AVNOJ. In addition to the Macedonian brigades operating under his command, in February 1944, he commanded the brigades from Kosovo and Southern Serbia. He became a member of the Initiative committee for the organization of the Antifascist Assembly of the National Liberation of Macedonia (ASNOM). He participated in the First Session of the ASNOM and was elected to its presidency.

After World War II
After the Second World War Apostolski became one of the military leaders of the new SFRY. After the end of his active military service, he began intensively dealing with the history of the Macedonian nation. From 1965 to 1970, he was the head of the Institute of National History in Skopje, SR Macedonia. He was accused of systematically falsifying history and in the use of hate speech against Bulgaria and the Bulgarian people. On that occasion Apostolski became famous among Bulgarian historians with his phrase: "I have no evidence, but I claim it." He was actively involved in the formation of the Macedonian Academy of Sciences and Arts, of which he was member of since its creation. He was also its president for the period 1976–1983.
He was also a member of:
 Serbian Academy of Sciences,
 Yugoslav Academy of Sciences and Arts (now: Croatian Academy of Sciences and Arts),
 Academy of Sciences and Arts of Bosnia and Herzegovina and
 Academy of Sciences and Arts of Kosovo.

He died on August 7, 1987, in Dojran, SFR Yugoslavia.

Legacy 

In 1995, the Military Academy in Republic of Macedonia was named "General Mihailo Apostolski".

His birthplace, the House of Mihajlo Apostolski, is a recognized as an object of Cultural Heritage of North Macedonia.

Notes

References

External links 
  

1906 births
1987 deaths
People from Štip
People from Kosovo vilayet
Yugoslav Partisans members
League of Communists of Macedonia politicians
Generals of the Yugoslav People's Army
Yugoslav prisoners of war
Yugoslav communists
Yugoslav historians
Members of the Serbian Academy of Sciences and Arts
World War II prisoners of war held by Germany
Recipients of the Order of the People's Hero
Yugoslav people of Bulgarian descent
Macedonian atheists
Macedonian people of Bulgarian descent